Peterson is an unincorporated community in Kirkland Township, Adams County, in the U.S. state of Indiana.

History
Peterson was named for Smith Peterson, who was instrumental in bringing the railroad to the settlement. A post office was established at Peterson in 1880, and remained in operation until it was discontinued in 1940.

Geography

References

Unincorporated communities in Adams County, Indiana
Unincorporated communities in Indiana